Trierweiler is a municipality in the Trier-Saarburg district, in Rhineland-Palatinate, Germany. The name Trierweiler was first mentioned in 1202. Because of the town's close proximity to the Luxembourg border, many residents commute to work in Luxembourg.

References

Municipalities in Rhineland-Palatinate
Trier-Saarburg